Cullinane is a rural locality in the Cassowary Coast Region, Queensland, Australia.

Geography 
Cullinane is bounded by the North Coast railway line to the west, See Poy Road to the north, Johnstone River to the east and Campbell Street to the south-east.

There is some suburban housing in the east of the suburb but the remainder of the suburb is used for agriculture, predominantly sugarcane farming.

History 
The locality name was adopted in August 1996. It was proposed by the Johnstone Shire Council, after pioneer farmer Michael Cullinane.

Education 
There are no schools in Cullinane. The nearest primary school is Innisfail State School in neighbouring Innisfail to the south. The nearest secondary school is Innisfail State College in Innisfail Estate across the river to the east. There are Catholic primary and secondary schools in Innisfail.

References 

Cassowary Coast Region
Localities in Queensland